The history of art focuses on objects made by humans for any number of spiritual, narrative, philosophical, symbolic, conceptual, documentary, decorative, and even functional and other purposes, but with a primary emphasis on its aesthetic visual form. Visual art can be classified in diverse ways, such as separating fine arts from applied arts; inclusively focusing on human creativity; or focusing on different media such as architecture, sculpture, painting, film, photography, and graphic arts. In recent years, technological advances have led to video art, computer art, performance art, animation, television, and videogames.

The history of art is often told as a chronology of masterpieces created during each civilization. It can thus be framed as a story of high culture, epitomized by the Wonders of the World. On the other hand, vernacular art expressions can also be integrated into art historical narratives, referred to as folk arts or craft. The more closely that an art historian engages with these latter forms of low culture, the more likely it is that they will identify their work as examining visual culture or material culture, or as contributing to fields related to art history, such as anthropology or archaeology. In the latter cases, art objects may be referred to as archeological artifacts.

Prehistory

Prehistoric art includes a broad range of art made by painters and sculptors from illiterate cultures, including some of the earliest human artifacts. Among the first art objects are decorative artifacts from Middle Stone Age Africa. Containers from that period have also been discovered in South Africa that may have been used to hold paints dating as far back as 100,000 years ago. 

A form of prehistoric art found all over the world, especially in Europe, small prehistoric statuettes known as Venus figurines with exaggerated breasts and bellies were made, the most famous ones being the Venus of Hohle Fels and the Venus of Willendorf, found in Germany and Austria. Most have small heads, wide hips, and legs that taper to a point. Arms and feet are often absent, and the head is usually small and faceless.
The Venus of Hohle Fels is one of the numerous objects found at the Caves and Ice Age Art in the Swabian Jura UNESCO World Heritage Site, where the oldest non-stationary works of human art yet discovered were found, in the form of carved animal and humanoid figurines, in addition to the oldest musical instruments unearthed so far, with the artifacts dating between 43,000 and 35,000 BC.

The best-known prehistoric artworks are the large Paleolithic cave paintings that depict animals in continental Europe, particularly the ones at Lascaux in the Dordogne region of France. Several hundred decorated caves are known, spanning the Upper Paleolithic period ( 38,000–12,000 BC). There are examples in Ukraine, Italy and Great Britain, but most of them are in France and Spain. Many theories have been suggested about the art's purpose, the most accepted being that it was part of religious rituals, possibly to evoke hunting success.

Antiquity

Ancient Near East

Ancient Near East stretched from Turkey and the Mediterranean seaboard in the west to Iran and the Arabian peninsula in the east. Over time, multiple civilizations appeared, lived and disappeared here. One of the key regions was Mesopotamia, which witnessed during the 4th millennium BC the emergence of the first cities and the earliest form of writing. Ancient Mesopotamia covers present-day Iraq, and parts of Syria and Turkey. Its northern half forms part of the so-called Fertile Crescent, where important Neolithic developments such as early farming and the establishment of permanent village settlements first appeared. Because the region is situated within the Tigris–Euphrates river delta, numerous civilizations lived here, notably Sumer, Akkad, Assyria and Babylonia. Mesopotamian architecture was characterized by the use of bricks, lintels, and cone mosaic. Notable examples are the ziggurats, large temples in the form of step pyramids.

The political, economic, artistic and architectural traditions of the Sumerians lead to the foundation of Western civilization. Multiple things appeared for the first time in Sumer: the first city-state (Uruk), ruled by king Gilgamesh; the first organized religion, based on a hierarchical structure of gods, people and rituals; the first known writing, the cuneiforms; the first irrigation system and the first vehicles with wheels. Cylinder seals appeared here as well, engraved with little inscriptions and illustrations. Another civilization that developed here was the Akkadian Empire, the world's first great empire.

During the early 1st millennium BC, after the Akkadians, an empire called Assyria came to dominate the whole of Middle East, stretching from the Persian Gulf to the Mediterranean Sea. Its cities were filled with impressive buildings and art. Assyrian art is best known for its detailed stone reliefs, depicting scenes of court life, religious practice, hunting and epic battles. These reliefs were initially painted in bright colours and placed in palaces. Besides their beauty, they also show us Assyrian life and views of the world, including Assyrian clothing and furniture.

Later, the Babylonians conquered the Assyrian Empire. During the 6th century BC, Babylon became the largest city in the world. Upon entering Babylon, visitors were greeted with the impressive Ishtar Gate, with its walls covered in vivid blue glazed bricks and reliefs showing dragons, bulls and lions. This gate is named after Ishtar, the goddess of war and love.

In the mid-6th century BC, after a series of military campaigns, the Babylonian Empire fell to the Achaemenid Empire, ruled by King Cyrus II, stretching across the Middle East and Central Asia, from Egypt to the Indus Valley. Its art incorporates elements from across the empire, celebrating its wealth and power. Persepolis (Iran) was the capital of the empire, and it is full of impressive sculptures showing religious images and people of the empire. There are also the ruins of a palace here, with a big audience hall for receiving guests.

Besides Mesopotamia and Iran, there were Ancient civilizations who produced art and architecture in other regions as well. In Anatolia (present-day Turkey), the Hittite Empire appeared. During Antiquity, South Arabia was important in the production and trade of aromatics, bringing wealth to the kingdoms that were in this region. Before circa 4000 BC, the climate of Arabia was wetter than today. In south-west, several kingdoms appeared, like Saba’. The south Arabian human figure is usually stylized, based on rectangular shapes, but with fine details.

Egypt

One of the first great civilizations arose in Egypt, which had elaborate and complex works of art produced by professional artists and craftspeople. Egypt's art was religious and symbolic. Given that the culture had a highly centralized power structure and hierarchy, a great deal of art was created to honour the pharaoh, including great monuments. Egyptian art and culture emphasized the religious concept of immortality. Later Egyptian art includes Coptic and Byzantine art.

The architecture is characterized by monumental structures, built with large stone blocks, lintels, and solid columns. Funerary monuments included mastaba, tombs of rectangular form; pyramids, which included step pyramids (Saqqarah) or smooth-sided pyramids (Giza); and the hypogeum, underground tombs (Valley of the Kings). Other great buildings were the temple, which tended to be monumental complexes preceded by an avenue of sphinxes and obelisks. Temples used pylons and trapezoid walls with hypaethros and hypostyle halls and shrines. The temples of Karnak, Luxor, Philae and Edfu are good examples. Another type of temple is the rock temple, in the form of a hypogeum, found in Abu Simbel and Deir el-Bahari.

Painting of the Egyptian era used a juxtaposition of overlapping planes. The images were represented hierarchically, i.e., the Pharaoh is larger than the common subjects or enemies depicted at his side. Egyptians painted the outline of the head and limbs in profile, while the torso, hands, and eyes were painted from the front. Applied arts were developed in Egypt, in particular woodwork and metalwork. There are superb examples such as cedar furniture inlaid with ebony and ivory which can be seen in the tombs at the Egyptian Museum. Other examples include the pieces found in Tutankhamun's tomb, which are of great artistic value.

Indus Valley Civilization

Discovered in 1922, long after the contemporary cultures of Mesopotamia and Egypt, the Indus Valley Civilization, aka the Harappan Civilization ( 2400–1900 BC) is now recognized as extraordinarily advanced, comparable in some ways with those cultures. Its sites span an area stretching from today's northeast Afghanistan, through much of Pakistan, and into western and northwestern India. Major cities of the culture include Harappa and Mohenjo-daro, located respectively in Punjab and in Sindh province in northern Pakistan, and the port city Lothal, in the state of Gujarat (India). The most numerous artefacts are square and rectangular stamp seals and seal impressions, featuring animals, usually bulls, very short Harappan texts. Many stylized terracotta figurines have also been found in Harappan sites, and a few stone and bronze sculptures, more naturalistic than the ceramic ones.

China

Th first metal objects produced in China were made almost 4000 years ago, during the Xia dynasty (2100–1700 BC). During the Chinese Bronze Age (the Shang and Zhou dynasties) court intercessions and communication with the spirit world were conducted by a shaman (possibly the king himself). In the Shang dynasty (1600–1050 BC), the supreme deity was Shangdi, but aristocratic families preferred to contact the spirits of their ancestors. They prepared elaborate banquets of food and drink for them, heated and served in bronze ritual vessels. These bronze vessels had many shapes, depending on their purpose: for wine, water, cereals or meat, and some of them were marked with readable characters, which shows the development of writing. This kind of vessels, of a very high quality and complexity, were discovered on the Valley of the Yellow River in the Henan province, in sites like Erlitou, Anyang or Zhengzhou. They were used in religious rituals to cement the Dhang authority, and when the Shang capital fell, around 1050 BC, its conquerors, the Zhou (1050–156 BC), continued to use these containers in religious rituals, but principally for food rather than drink. The Shang court had been accused of excessive drunkenness, and the Zhou, promoting the imperial Tian ("Heaven") as the prime spiritual force, rather than ancestors, limited wine in religious rites, in favour of food. The use of ritual bronzes continued into the early Han dynasty (206 BC–220 AD).

One of the most commonly used motifs was the taotie, a stylized face divided centrally into two almost mirror-image halves, with nostrils, eyes, eyebrows, jaws, cheeks and horns, surrounded by incised patterns. Whether taotie represented real, mythological or wholly imaginary creatures cannot be determined.

The enigmatic bronzes of Sanxingdui, near Guanghan (in Sichuan province), are evidence for a mysterious sacrificial religious system unlike anything elsewhere in ancient China and quite different from the art of the contemporaneous Shang at Anyang. Excavations at Sanxingdui since 1986 have revealed four pits containing artefacts of bronze, jade and gold. There was found a great bronze statue of a human figure which stands on a plinth decorated with abstract elephant heads. Besides the standing figure, the first two pits contained over 50 bronze heads, some wearing headgear and three with a frontal covering of gold leaf. Tubular bronze fragments with little branches were discovered here as well, probably representing trees, and also bronze leaves, fruits and birds. Over 4000 objects were found at Sanxingdui in 1986.

Succeeding the Shang Dynasty Zhou (1050–221 BC) ruled more than any other one from Chinese history. Its last centuries were characterized by violence, the era being known as the Warring States period. During this troubling time, some philosophical movements appeared: Confucianism, Daoism and Legalism.

The Warring States period was ended by Qinshi Huangdi, who united China in 221 BC. He ordered a huge tomb, guarded by the Terracotta Army. Another huge project was a predecessor of the Great Wall, erected for rejecting pillaging tribes from the north. After the death of the emperor, his dynasty, the Qin (221–206 BC), lasted only three years. Qinshi Huangdi was followed by the Han Dynasty (202 BC-220 AD), during which the Silk Road developed considerably, bringing new cultural influences in China.

Greek

Through harmonious proportion and a focus on aesthetics, ancient Greek and Roman art became the foundation and inspiration of all Western art, being the standard to which most European artists aspired, until the 19th century. The Latin poet Horace, writing in the age of Roman emperor Augustus (1st century BC to 1st century AD), famously remarked that although conquered on the battlefield, "captive Greece overcame its savage conqueror and brought the arts to rustic Rome." The power of Greek art lies in its representation of the human figure and its focus on human beings and the anthropomorphic gods as chief subjects. The artworks of the Greeks were meant to decorate temples and public buildings, to celebrate battle victories and remarkable personalities, and to commemorate the dead. They were also given as offerings to the gods.

Although there was no definitive transition, the art is usually divided stylistically into the four periods of Geometric, Archaic, Classical and Hellenistic. During the Classical period (5th and 4th centuries BC), realism and idealism were delicately balanced. In comparison, the works of the earlier Geometric (9th to 8th centuries BC) and Archaic (7th to 6th centuries BC) ages can seem appear primitive, but these artists had different goals: naturalistic representation was not necessarily their aim. Greek and artists built on the artistic foundations of Egypt, further developing the arts of sculpture, painting, architecture, and ceramics. Among the techniques they perfected include methods of carving and casting sculptures, fresco painting and building magnificent buildings.

Roman art lovers collected ancient Greek originals, Roman replicas of Greek art, or newly created paintings and sculptures fashioned in a variety of Greek styles, thus preserving for posterity works of art otherwise lost. Wall and panel paintings, sculptures and mosaics decorated public spaces and private homes. Greek imagery also appeared on Roman jewellery, vessels of gold, silver, bronze and terracotta, and even on weapons and commercial weights. Rediscovered during the early Renaissance, the arts of ancient Greece, transmitted through the Roman Empire, have served as the foundation of Western art until the 19th century.

Since the advent of the Classical Age in Athens, in the 5th century BC, the Classical way of building has been deeply woven into Western understanding of architecture and, indeed, of civilization itself. From circa 850 BC to circa 300 AD, ancient Greek culture flourished on the Greek mainland, on the Peloponnese, and on the Aegean islands. Five of the Wonders of the World were Greek: the Temple of Artemis at Ephesus, the Statue of Zeus at Olympia, the Mausoleum at Halicarnassus, the Colossus of Rhodes, and the Lighthouse of Alexandria. However, Ancient Greek architecture is best known for its temples, many of which are found throughout the region, and the Parthenon is a prime example of this. Later, they will serve as inspiration for Neoclassical architects during the late 18th and the 19th century. The most well-known temples are the Parthenon and the Erechtheion, both on the Acropolis of Athens. Another type of important Ancient Greek buildings were the theatres. Both temples and theatres used a complex mix of optical illusions and balanced ratios.

Looking at the archaeological remains of ancient buildings it is easy to perceive them as limestone and concrete in a grey taupe tone and to make the assumption that ancient buildings were monochromatic. However, architecture was polychromed in much of the Ancient world. One of the most iconic Ancient buildings, the Parthenon ( 447–432 BC) in Athens, had details painted with vibrant reds, blues and greens. Besides ancient temples, Medieval cathedrals were never completely white. Most had colored highlights on capitals and columns. This practice of coloring buildings and artworks was abandoned during the early Renaissance. This is because Leonardo da Vinci and other Renaissance artists, including Michelangelo, promoted a color palette inspired by the ancient Greco-Roman ruins, which because of neglect and constant decay during the Middle Ages, became white despite being initially colorful. The pigments used in the ancient world were delicate and especially susceptible to weathering. Without necessary care, the colors exposed to rain, snow, dirt, and other factors, vanished over time, and this way Ancient buildings and artworks became white, like they are today and were during the Renaissance.

Rome

No civilization has had an impact as enduring and powerful on Western art as the Roman Empire. The legacy of ancient Rome is evident through the medieval and early modern periods, and Roman art continue to be reused in the modern era in both traditionalist and Postmodern artworks. Sometimes it is viewed as derived from Greek precedents, but also has its own distinguishing features, some of them inherited from Etruscan art. Roman sculpture is often less idealized than its Greek precedents, being very realistic. Roman architecture often used concrete, and features such as the round arch and dome were invented. Luxury objects in metal-work, gem engraving, ivory carvings, and glass are sometimes considered in modern terms to be minor forms of Roman art, although this would not necessarily have been the case for contemporaries. An innovation made possible by the Roman development of glass-blowing was cameo glass. A white 'shell' was first created, into which coloured glass was then blown so as to produce an interior lining. The white shell was then cut down to create relief patterns of white against a darker background. They also made mosaics, this way producing durable pictorial art with cut-stone cubes (tesserae) and/or chips of coloured terracotta and glass. Some villas of wealthy Romans had their walls covered with frescos, aimed at dazziling and entertaining guests. Much of Roman wall painting that survives comes from sites around the Bay of Naples, in particular Pompeii and Herculaneum, thriving towns that were preserved under metres of volcanic debris when Mount Vesuvius erupted in 79 AD. As a result, Roman wall painting is often discussed in terms of four 'Pompeian styles'.

The Romans were deeply influenced by all aspects of Hellenistic culture. In architecture, just like in other art media, they essentially adopted the Classical language and adapted it to new situations and uses. The Romans also have their own innovations brought to Classical architecture. They used the Doric, Ionic and Corinthian orders in a far freer manner than the Greeks had, creating their own version of the Doric and using the Corinthian far more frequently. They also added two new orders to the repertoire: the Tuscan, a simpler, more massive version of the Doric derived from Etruscan architecture; and the Composite, a combination of the scroll-like volutes of the Ionic with the Corinthian's acanthus leaves. Other important innovations include the arch, and the dome. Using arches, they built aqueducts and monumental triumphal arches. Roman emperors were proud of their conquests, and commemorated them at home and in the conquered territories through triumphal arches, a good example of this being the Arch of Constantine in Rome. Between 30 and 15 BC, the architect and civil and military engineer Marcus Vitruvius Pollio published a majore treatise, De Architectura, which influenced architects around the world for centuries.

After the Middle Ages, with the Renaissance that started in Florence (Italy), a growing interest for ancient Rome started. During it, for the first time since Classical Antiquity, art became convincingly lifelike. The Renaissance also sparked interest for ancient Greek and Roman literature, not just for art and architecture.

Islamic

Islamic art is well-known since the Middle Ages for the use of elaborate geometric patterns, colourful tiles, stylized natural motifs and detailed calligraphy. Rarely has lettering had such a profound impact on applied arts and architecture. Islam appeared in western Arabia in the 7th century AD through revelations delivered to the prophet Muhammad in Mecca. Within a century of Muhammad's death the Islamic empires controlled the Middle East, Spain and parts of Asia and Africa. Because of this, similarly with Roman art, Islamic art and architecture had regional versions. As the Islamic world extended into centres of late antique culture, it was enriched by philosophical and intellectual movements. The translation of Greek works into Arabic and advances in mathematics and science were encouraged by early caliphates. This is in contrast with the modern perception that Islamic art is dogmatic and unchanging. Human and animal representation wasn't rare. Only certain periods restricted it (similar with the Byzantine Iconoclasm).

Americas

Mesoamerica

Some of the first great civilizations in the Americas developed in Mesoamerica (meaning 'middle Americas'), the most well known being the Mayans and the Aztecs.

The Olmecs (1400–400 BC) were the first major civilization in modern-day Mexico. Many elements of Mesoamerican civilizations, like the practice of building of pyramids, the complex calendar, the pantheon of gods and hieroglyphic writing have origins in Olmec culture. They produced jade and ceramic figurines, colossal heads and pyramids with temples at the top, all without the advantage of metal tools. For them, jadeite was a stone more precious than gold and symbolized divine powers and fertility. 17 Olmec colossal heads have been discovered, each weighing a few tons. Each head, with the flattened nose and thick lips, wears a helmet, similar with the ones worn during official ball games, possibly representing kings of officials.

The Maya civilization began around 1800 BC and grew until the arrival of Spanish colonizers in the 1500s. They occupied southeast Mexico, Guatemala, Belize, and parts of Honduras and El Salvador. The Mayans were trading with cities, like Teotihuacán, but also with many Mesoamerican civilizations, like the Zapotecs or the other groups from central or coast areas of Mexico, and also with populations that didn't inhabit Mesoamerican territories, like the Taíno from the Caribbean. They produced impressive king portraits, polychrome ceramic vessels, earthenware figures, wooden sculptures, stelas, and built complex cities with pyramids. Most of the well preserved polychrome ceramic vessels were discovered in the tombs of nobles.

Arising from humble beginnings as a nomadic group, the Aztecs created the largest empire in Mesoamerican history, lasting from 1427 to 1521. They didn't call themselves 'Aztecs', but Mexica. The term Aztecs was assigned by historians. They transformed the capital of their empire, Tenochtitlan, into a place where artists of Mesoamerica created impressive artworks for their new masters. The present-day Mexico City was built over the Aztec capital, Tenochtitlan.

Colombia 

Similarly with Mesoamerica, the present-day territory of Colombia is an area where multiple cultures developed before the arrival of Spanish colonizers. Here, gold body accessories were produced, many golden ones, but also many other ones made of tumbaga, a non-specific alloy of gold and copper given by Spanish Conquistadors to metals composed of these elements found in widespread use in pre-Columbian Mesoamerica in North America and South America.

Andean regions 

The ancient civilizations of Peru and Bolivia nurtured unique artistic traditions, including one of the world's most aesthetically impressive fibre art traditions. Two of the first important cultures from this land are the Chavín and the Paracas culture.

The Paracas culture of the south coast of Peru is best known for its complex patterned textiles, particularly mantels. The Moche controlled the river valleys of the north coast, while the Nazca of southern Peru held sway along the coastal deserts and contiguous mountains. The Nazca are best known for the famous Nazca Lines, a group of geoglyphs in a desert in southern Peru. They also produced polychrome ceramics and textiles influenced by the Paracas, and used a palette of at least 10 colours for their pottery. Both cultures flourished around 100–800 AD. Moche pottery is some of the most varied in the world. In the north, the Wari (or Huari) Empire are noted for their stone architecture and sculpture accomplishments.

The Chimú were preceded by a simple ceramic style known as Sicán (700–900 AD). The Chimú produced excellent portrait and decorative works in metal, notably gold but especially silver. Later, the Inca Empire (1100–1533) stretched across the Andes Mountains. They crafted precious metal figurines, and like other civilizations from the same area, complex textiles. Llamas were important animals, because of their wool and for carrying loads.

Asian

Eastern civilization broadly includes Asia, and it also includes a complex tradition of art making. One approach to Eastern art history divides the field by nation, with foci on Indian art, Chinese art, and Japanese art. Due to the size of the continent, the distinction between Eastern Asia and Southern Asia in the context of arts can be clearly seen. In most of Asia, pottery was a prevalent form of art. The pottery is often decorated with geometric patterns or abstract representations of animals, people or plants. Other very widespread forms of art were, and are, sculpture and painting.

Central Asia

Central Asian art developed in Central Asia, in areas corresponding to modern Kyrgyzstan, Kazakhstan, Uzbekistan, Turkmenistan, Azerbaijan, Tajikistan, Afghanistan, Pakistan, and parts of modern Mongolia, China and Russia. The art of ancient and medieval Central Asia reflects the rich history of this vast area, home to a huge variety of peoples, religions and ways of life. The artistic remains of the region show a remarkable combinations of influences that exemplify the multicultural nature of Central Asian society. The Silk Road transmission of art, Scythian art, Greco-Buddhist art, Serindian art and more recently Persianate culture, are all part of this complicated history. Central Asia has always been a crossroads of cultural exchange, the hub of the so-called Silk Road – that complex system of trade routes stretching from China to the Mediterranean. Already in the Bronze Age (3rd and 2nd millennium BC), growing settlements formed part of an extensive network of trade linking Central Asia to the Indus Valley, Mesopotamia and Egypt.

Indian

Early Buddhists in India developed symbols related to Buddha. The major survivals of Buddhist art begin in the period after the Mauryans, within North India Kushan art, the Greco-Buddhist art of Gandhara and finally the "classic" period of Gupta art. Additionally, there was the Andhra school which appeared before the Gandhara school and which was based in South India. Good quantities of sculpture survives from some key sites such as Sanchi, Bharhut and Amaravati, some of which remain in situ, with others in museums in India or around the world. Stupas were surrounded by ceremonial fences with four profusely carved toranas or ornamental gateways facing the cardinal directions. These are in stone, though clearly adopting forms developed in wood. They and the walls of the stupa itself can be heavily decorated with reliefs, mostly illustrating the lives of the Buddha. Gradually life-size figures were sculpted, initially in deep relief, but then free-standing. Mathura art was the most important centre in this development, which applied to Hindu and Jain art as well as Buddhist. The facades and interiors of rock-cut chaitya prayer halls and monastic viharas have survived better than similar free-standing structures elsewhere, which were for long mostly in wood. The caves at Ajanta, Karle, Bhaja and elsewhere contain early sculpture, often outnumbered by later works such as iconic figures of the Buddha and bodhisattvas, which are not found before 100 AD at the least.

Chinese

In Eastern Asia, painting was derived from the practice of calligraphy, and portraits and landscapes were painted on silk cloth. Most of the paintings represent landscapes or portraits. The most spectacular sculptures are the ritual bronzes and the bronze sculptures from Sanxingdui. A very well-known example of Chinese art is the Terracotta Army, depicting the armies of Qin Shi Huang, the first Emperor of China. It is a form of funerary art buried with the emperor in 210–209 BC whose purpose was to protect the emperor in his afterlife.

Chinese art is one of the oldest continuous traditional arts in the world, and is marked by an unusual degree of continuity within, and consciousness of, that tradition, lacking an equivalent to the Western collapse and gradual recovery of classical styles. The media that have usually been classified in the West since the Renaissance as the decorative arts are extremely important in Chinese art, and much of the finest work was produced in large workshops or factories by essentially unknown artists, especially in Chinese ceramics. The range and quality of goods that decorated Chinese palaces and households, and their inhabitants, is dazzling. Materials came from across China and far beyond: gold and silver, mother of pearl, ivory and rhinoceros horn, wood and lacquer, jade and soap stone, silk and paper.

Japanese

Japanese art covers a wide range of art styles and media, including ancient pottery, sculpture, ink painting and calligraphy on silk and paper, ukiyo-e paintings and woodblock prints, ceramics, origami, and more recently manga—modern Japanese cartooning and comics—along with a myriad of other types.

The first settlers of Japan, the Jōmon people (c. 11,000–300 BC). They crafted lavishly decorated pottery storage vessels, clay figurines called dogū. Japan has been subject to sudden invasions of new ideas followed by long periods of minimal contact with the outside world. Over time the Japanese developed the ability to absorb, imitate, and finally assimilate those elements of foreign culture that complemented their aesthetic preferences. The earliest complex art in Japan was produced in the 7th and 8th centuries in connection with Buddhism. In the 9th century, as the Japanese began to turn away from China and develop indigenous forms of expression, the secular arts became increasingly important; until the late 15th century, both religious and secular arts flourished. After the Ōnin War (1467–1477), Japan entered a period of political, social, and economic disruption that lasted for over a century. In the state that emerged under the leadership of the Tokugawa shogunate, organized religion played a much less important role in people's lives, and the arts that survived were primarily secular.

Sub-Saharan Africa

Sub-Saharan African art includes both sculpture, typified by the brass castings of the Benin people, Igbo Ukwu and the Kingdom of Ifẹ, and terracottas of Djenne-Jeno, Ife, and the more ancient Nok culture, as well as folk art. Concurrent with the European Middle Ages, in the eleventh century AD a nation that made grand architecture, gold sculpture, and intricate jewelry was founded in Great Zimbabwe. Impressive sculpture was concurrently being cast from brass by the Yoruba people of what is now Nigeria. In the Benin Kingdom, also of southern Nigeria, which began around the same time, elegant altar tusks, brass heads, plaques of brass, and palatial architecture were created. The Benin Kingdom was ended by the British in 1897, and little of the culture's art now remains in Nigeria. Today, the most significant arts venue in Africa is the Johannesburg Biennale.

Sub-Saharan Africa is characterized by a high density of cultures. Notable are the, Dogon people from Mali; Edo, Yoruba, Igbo people and the Nok civilization from Nigeria; Kuba and Luba people from Central Africa; Ashanti people from Ghana; Zulu people from Southern Africa; and Fang people from Equatorial Guinea (85%), Cameroon and Gabon; the Sao civilization people from Chad; Kwele people from eastern Gabon, Republic of the Congo and Cameroon.

The myriad forms of African art are components of some of the most vibrant and responsive artistic traditions in the world and are integral to the lives of African people. Created for specific purposes, artworks can reveal their ongoing importance through physical transformations that enhance both their appearance and their potency. Many traditional African art forms are created as conduits to the spirit world and change appearance as materials are added to enhance their beauty and potency. The more a work is used and blessed, the more abstract it becomes with the accretion of sacrificial matter and the wearing down of original details.

Oceania

The Art of Oceania includes the geographic areas of Micronesia, Polynesia, Australia, New Zealand, and Melanesia. One approach treats the area thematically, with foci on ancestry, warfare, the body, gender, trade, religion, and tourism. Unfortunately, little ancient art survives from Oceania. Scholars believe that this is likely because artists used perishable materials, such as wood and feathers, which did not survive in the tropical climate, and there are no historical records to refer to most of this material. The understanding of Oceania's artistic cultures thus begins with the documentation of it by Westerners, such as Captain James Cook, in the 18th century. At the turn of the 20th century the French artist Paul Gauguin spent significant amounts of time in Tahiti, living with local people and making modern art — a fact that has become intertwined with Tahitian visual culture to the present day. The indigenous art of Australia often looks like abstract modern art, but it has deep roots in local culture.

The art of Oceania is the last great tradition of art to be appreciated by the world at large. Despite being one of the longest continuous traditions of art in the world, dating back at least fifty millennia, it remained relatively unknown until the second half of the 20th century.

The often ephemeral materials of Aboriginal art of Australia makes it difficult to determine the antiquity of the majority of the forms of art practised today. The most durable forms are the multitudes of rock engravings and rock paintings which are found across the continent. In the Arnhem Land escarpment, evidence suggests that paintings were being made fifty thousand years ago, antedating the Palaeolithic rock paintings of Altamira & Lascaux in Europe.

European

Medieval

With the decline of the Roman Empire in  300 AD, the Medieval era began, lasting for about a millennium, until the beginning of the Renaissance in  1400. Early Christian art begins the period, followed by Byzantine art, Anglo-Saxon art, Viking art, Ottonian art, Romanesque art and Gothic art, with Islamic art dominating the eastern Mediterranean. Medieval art grew out of the artistic heritage of the Roman Empire and Byzantium, mixed with the 'barbarian' artistic culture of northern Europe.

In Byzantine and Gothic art of the Middle Ages, the dominance of the church resulted in a large amount of religious art. There was extensive use of gold in paintings, which presented figures in simplified forms.

Byzantine

Byzantine art refers to the body of Christian Greek artistic products of the Eastern Roman (Byzantine) Empire, as well as the nations and states that inherited culturally from the empire. Though the empire itself emerged from Rome's decline and lasted until the Fall of Constantinople in 1453, the start date of the Byzantine period is rather clearer in art history than in political history, if still imprecise. Many Eastern Orthodox states in Eastern Europe, as well as to some degree the Muslim states of the eastern Mediterranean, preserved many aspects of the empire's culture and art for centuries afterward.

Surviving Byzantine art is mostly religious and with exceptions at certain periods is highly conventionalised, following traditional models that translate carefully controlled church theology into artistic terms. Painting in fresco, illuminated manuscripts and on wood panel and, especially in earlier periods, mosaic were the main media, and figurative sculpture very rare except for small carved ivories. Manuscript painting preserved to the end some of the classical realist tradition that was missing in larger works. Byzantine art was highly prestigious and sought-after in Western Europe, where it maintained a continuous influence on medieval art until near the end of the period. This was especially so in Italy, where Byzantine styles persisted in modified form through the 12th century, and became formative influences on Italian Renaissance art. But few incoming influences affected the Byzantine style. With the expansion of the Eastern Orthodox church, Byzantine forms and styles spread throughout the Orthodox world and beyond. Influences from Byzantine architecture, particularly in religious buildings, can be found in diverse regions from Egypt and Arabia to Russia and Romania.

Byzantine architecture is notorious for the use of domes. It also often featured marble columns, coffered ceilings and sumptuous decoration, including the extensive use of mosaics with golden backgrounds. The building material used by Byzantine architects was no longer marble, which was very appreciated by the Ancient Greeks. They used mostly stone and brick, and also thin alabaster sheets for windows. Mosaics were used to cover brick walls, and any other surface where fresco wouldn't resist. Good examples of mosaics from the proto-Byzantine era are in Hagios Demetrios in Thessaloniki (Greece), the Basilica of Sant'Apollinare Nuovo and the Basilica of San Vitale, both in Ravenna (Italy), and Hagia Sophia in Istanbul. Greco-Roman temples and Byzantine churches differ substantially in terms of their exterior and interior aspect. In Antiquity, the exterior was the most important part of the temple, because in the interior, where the cult statue of the deity to whom the temple was built was kept, only the priest had access. The ceremonies here held outside, and what the worshipers view was the facade of the temple, consisting of columns, with an entablature and two pediments. Meanwhile, Christian liturgies were held in the interior of the churches, the exterior usually having little to no ornamentation.

Ottonian

Ottonian art is a style in pre-romanesque German art, covering also some works from the Low Countries, northern Italy and eastern France. It was named by the art historian Hubert Janitschek after the Ottonian dynasty which ruled Germany and northern Italy between 919 and 1024 under the kings Henry I, Otto I, Otto II, Otto III and Henry II. With Ottonian architecture, it is a key component of the Ottonian Renaissance (circa 951–1024).  However, the style neither began nor ended to neatly coincide with the rule of the dynasty.  It emerged some decades into their rule and persisted past the Ottonian emperors into the reigns of the early Salian dynasty, which lacks an artistic "style label" of its own.  In the traditional scheme of art history, Ottonian art follows Carolingian art and precedes Romanesque art, though the transitions at both ends of the period are gradual rather than sudden.  Like the former and unlike the latter, it was very largely a style restricted to a few of the small cities of the period, and important monasteries, as well as the court circles of the emperor and his leading vassals.

After the decline of the Carolingian Empire, the Holy Roman Empire was re-established under the Saxon Ottonian dynasty. From this emerged a renewed faith in the idea of Empire and a reformed Church, creating a period of heightened cultural and artistic fervour. It was in this atmosphere that masterpieces were created that fused the traditions from which Ottonian artists derived their inspiration: models of Late Antique, Carolingian, and Byzantine origin.  Surviving Ottonian art is very largely religious, in the form of illuminated manuscripts and metalwork, and was produced in a small number of centres for a narrow range of patrons in the circle of the Imperial court, as well as important figures in the church.  However much of it was designed for display to a wider public, especially of pilgrims.

The style is generally grand and heavy, sometimes to excess, and initially less sophisticated than the Carolingian equivalents, with less direct influence from Byzantine art and less understanding of its classical models, but around 1000 a striking intensity and expressiveness emerge in many works, as "a solemn monumentality is combined with a vibrant inwardness, an unworldly, visionary quality with sharp attention to actuality, surface patterns of flowing lines and rich bright colours with passionate emotionalism".

Romanesque

The Romanesque was the first pan-European style to emerge after the Roman Empire, spanning the mid-tenth century to the thirteenth. The period saw a resurgence of monumental stone structures with complex structural programmes.

Romanesque churches are characterized by rigid articulation and geometric clarity, incorporated into a unified volumetric whole. The architecture is austere but enlivened by decorative sculpting of capitals and portals, as well as frescoed interiors. Geometric and foliate patterning gives way to increasingly three-dimensional figurative sculpture.

St. Michael's Church, Hildesheim, Germany, 1001–1030, is seen as a Proto-Romanesque church.

From the mid-eleventh to the early thirteenth centuries, Romanesque paintings were two-dimensional, defined by bold, linear outlines and geometry, particularly in the handling of drapery; symmetry and frontality were emphasised. Virtually all Western churches were painted, but probably only a few wall painters were monks; instead, itinerant artists carried out most of this work. Basic blocking out was done on wet plaster with earth colours. A limited palette, dominated by white, red, yellow ochres and azure, was employed for maximum visual effect, with dense colouring forming a backdrop of bands, a practice that originated in late Classical art as an attempt to distinguish earth and sky.

During the later eleventh and twelfth centuries, the great age of Western monasticism, Europe experienced unprecedented economic, social and political change, leading to burgeoning wealth among landowners, including monasteries. There was increasing demand for books, and economic wealth allowed many manuscripts to be richly illuminated.

One of the outstanding artefacts of the age is the 70 m long Bayeux Tapestry. It depicts the events leading up to the Norman conquest of England with protagonists William, Duke of Normandy, and Harold, Earl of Wessex, later King of England, and culminating in the Battle of Hastings. It is thought to date from the 11th century. It tells the story from the point of view of the conquering Normans, but is now agreed to have been made in England most likely by women, although the designer is unknown. It is housed in France.

Gothic

Gothic art developed in Northern France out of Romanesque in the 12th century AD, and led by the concurrent development of Gothic architecture. It spread to all of Western Europe, and much of Southern and Central Europe, never quite effacing more classical styles in Italy. In the late 14th century, the sophisticated court style of International Gothic developed, which continued to evolve until the late 15th century.

The imposing Gothic cathedrals, with their sculptural programmes and stained glass windows, epitomize the Gothic style. It differs from Romanesque through its rib-shaped vaults, and the use of ogives. Instead of the thick Romanesque walls, Gothic buildings are thin and tall. Spiral stairs in towers are specific to Gothic architecture.

Gothic painting, much of it executed in tempera and, later, oils on panel, as well as fresco, and with an increasingly broad palette of secondary colours, is generally seen as more 'naturalistic' than Romanesque. The humanity of religious narrative was highlighted, and the emotional state of the characters individualized. The increased urbanity of the medieval economy and the rise of the clerical and lay patron saw a change in the nature of the art market, which can be seen in developments in Gothic manuscript illumination. Workshops employed specialists for different elements of the page, such as figures or marginal vine motifs.

Renaissance

Encompassing Early, Northern and High Renaissance, the term Renaissance describes the 'rebirth' in Europe of a new interest for Classical antiquity. For the first time since antiquity, art became convincingly lifelike. Besides the ancient past, Renaissance artists also studied nature, understanding the human body, animals, plants, space, perspective and the qualities of light. The most common theme were religious subjects, but depictions of mythological stories were produced as well. Also, there was no uniform Renaissance style. Each artist developed their own distinct visual language, influenced by their predecessors and contemporaries.

The Early Renaissance was a period of great creative and intellectual activity when artists broke away completely from the parameters of Byzantine art. It is generally accepted that it started in Florence in present-day Italy in the early 15th century. It is characterized by a surge of interest in classical literature, philosophy and art, the growth of commerce, the discovery of new continents, and new inventions. There was a revival of interest in the art and literature of ancient Rome, and the study of ancient Greek and Latin texts instigated concepts of individualism and reason, which became known as humanism. Humanists considered life in the present and emphasized the importance of individual thought, which affected artists' approaches.

Despite being highly associated with Italy, particularly with Florence, Rome, and Venice, the rest of Western Europe participated to the Renaissance as well. The Northern Renaissance occurred in Europe north of the Alps from the early 15th century, following a period of artistic cross-fertilization between north and south known as 'International Gothic'. There was a big difference between the Northern and Italian Renaissance. The North artists did not seek to revive the values of ancient Greece and Rome like the Italians, while in the south Italian artists and patrons were amazed by the empirical study of nature and the human society, and by the deep colors that northern artists could achieve in the newly developed medium of oil paint. The Protestant Reformation increased the northern interest in secular painting, like portraits or landscapes. Two key northern artists are Hieronymus Bosch, known for his surreal paintings filled with hybrid creatures like The Garden of Earthly Delights, and Albrecht Dürer, who brought the new art of printmaking to a new level.

The High Renaissance took place in the late 15th-early 16th centuries and was influenced by the fact that as papal power stabilized in Rome, several popes commissioned art and architecture, determined to recreate the city's former glory. Raphael and Michelangelo produced vast and grandiose projects for the popes. The most famous artwork of this part of the Renaissance is probably the ceiling of the Sistine Chapel.

Mannerism broke away from High Renaissance ideals of harmony and a rational approach to art, to embrace exaggerated forms, elongated proportions, and more vibrant colors. It developed in Italy between 1510 and 1520, among artists who prized originality above all. The name of this movement comes from the Italian maniera, meaning 'style or 'manner'. The word was meant to describe the standard of excellence achieved during the High Renaissance, to which all art should now adhere, but in practice it led to stylization and art 'to show art', sometimes with great success, an example being Raphael's pupil Giulio Romano. Mannerism has also been used more generally to describe a period following the Renaissance and preceding the Baroque.

Baroque

The 17th century was a period of volatile change, both in science, through inventions and developments, such as the telescope or the microscope, and in religion, as the Catholic Counter-Reformation contested the growing popularity of Protestant faith. After the Protestant Reformation the Catholic Church reacted with the Counter-Reformation, decreeing that art should inspire viewers with passionate religious themes.

Succeeding Mannerism, and developing as a result of religious tensions across Europe, Baroque art emerged in the late 16th century. The name may derive from 'barocco', the Portuguese word for misshaped pearl, and it describes art that combined emotion, dynamism and dramawith powerful color, realism and strong tonal contrasts. Between 1545 and 1563 at the Council of Trent, it was decided that religious art must encourage piety, realism and accuracy, and, by attracting viewers' attention and empathy, glorify the Catholic Church and strengthen the image of Catholicism. In the next century the radical new styles of Baroque art both embraced and developed High Renaissance models, and broke new ground both in religious art and in new varieties of secular art – above all landscape. The Baroque and its late variant the Rococo were the first truly global styles in the arts, dominating more than two centuries of art and architecture in Europe, Latin America and beyond from circa 1580 to circa 1750. Born in the painting studios of Bologna and Rome in the 1580s and 1590s, and in Roman sculptural and architectural ateliers in the second and third decades of the 17th century, the Baroque spread swiftly throughout Italy, Spain and Portugal, Flanders, France, the Netherlands, England, Scandinavia, and Russia, as well as to central and eastern European centres from Munich (Germany) to Vilnius (Lithuania). The Portuguese, Spanish and French empires and the Dutch treading network had a leading role in spreading the two styles into the Americas and colonial Africa and Asia, to places such as Lima, Mozambique, Goa and the Philippines.

Just like paintings and sculptures, Baroque cathedrals and palaces are characterised by the use of illusion and drama as well. They also frequently use dramatic effects of light and shade, and have sumptuous, highly decorated interiors that blurred the boundaries between architecture, painting and sculpture. Another important characteristic of Baroque architecture was the presence of dynamism, done through curves, Solomonic columns and ovals. In France, Baroque is synonymous with the reign of Louis XIV between 1643 and 1715, since multiple monumental buildings were built in Paris, Versailles and other parts of France during his rule, such as the Palace of Versailles, the Château de Maisons, the Château de Vaux-le-Vicomte, the Louvre Colonnade or The Dôme des Invalides. Besides the building itself, the space where it was placed has a role too. Baroque buildings try to seize viewers' attention and to dominate their surroundings, whether on a small scale such as the San Carlo alle Quattro Fontane in Rome, or on a massive one, like the new facade of the Santiago de Compostela Cathedral, designed to tower over the city. Applied arts prospered during this period as well. Baroque furniture could be as bombastic as the rooms they were meant to adorn, and their motifs and techniques were carefully calibrated to coordinate with the architect's overall decorative programme. One of the most prestigious furniture makers was André Charles Boulle, known for his marquetry technique, made by gluing sheets of tortoiseshell and brass together and cut to form the design. His works were also adorned with gilded bronze mounts. Complex Gobelins tapestries featured scenes inspired by classical antiquity, and the Savonnerie manufactory produced big highly detailed carpets for the Louvre. These carpets with black or yellow backgrounds had a central motif or a medallion. Chinese porcelain, Delftware and mirrors fabricated at Saint-Gobain (France) spread rapidly in all princely palaces and aristocratic residences in France. During the reign of Louis XIV, big mirrors are put above fireplace mantels, and this trend will last long after the Baroque period.

Rococo

Originating in 1720 Paris, Rococo is characterized by natural motifs, soft colours, curving lines, asymmetry and themes including love, nature and light-hearted entertainment. Its ideals were delicacy, gaiety, youthfulness and sensuality.

Beginning in France as a reaction against the heavy Baroque grandeur of Louis XIV's court at the Palace of Versailles, the rococo movement became associated particularly with the powerful Madame de Pompadour (1721–1764), the mistress of the new king Louis XV (1710–1774). Because of this, the style was also known as 'Pompadour'. The name of the movement derives from the French 'rocaille', or pebble, and refers to stones and shells that decorate the interiors of caves, as similar shell forms became a common feature in Rococo design. It began as a design and decorative arts style, and was characterized by elegant flowing shapes. Architecture followed and then painting and sculpture. The French painted with whom the term Rococo is most often associated is Jean-Antoine Watteau, whose pastoral scenes, or fêtes galantes, dominate the early part of the 18th century.

Although there are some important Bavarian churches in this style, such as the Wieskirche, Rococo is most often associated with secular buildings, principally great palaces and salons where educated elites would meet to discuss literary and philosophical ideas. In Paris, its popularity coincided with the emergence of the salon as a new type of social gathering, the venues for which were often decorated in the Rococo style. Among the most characteristically elegant and refined examples is the Salon Oval de la Princesse of the Hôtel de Soubise, one of the most beautiful 18th century mansions in Paris. The Rococo introduced dramatic changes to elite furniture, as it favoured smaller pieces with narrow, sinewy frames and more delicate, often asymmetrical decoration, often including elements of chinoiserie. The taste for Far Eastern objects (mainly Chinese) lead to the use of Chinese painted and lacquered panels for furniture.

The movement spread quickly throughout Europe and as far as Ottoman Turkey and China thanks to ornament books featuring cartouches, arabesques and shell work, as well as designs for wall panels and fireplaces. The most popular were made by Juste-Aurèle Meissonnier (1695–1750), Jacques-François Blondel (1705–1774), Pierre-Edmé Babel (1720–1775) and François de Cuvilliés (1695–1768).

Neoclassicism

Inspired by the excavations of the ancient Roman cities of Pompeii and Herculaneum from 1748, a renewed interest in the arts of antiquity occurred. Neoclassicism dominates Western art from the mid to late 18th century until the 1830s. Embracing order and restraint, it developed in reaction to the perceived frivolity, hedonism and decadence of Rococo and exemplifying the rational thinking of the 'Age of Enlightenment' (aka the 'Age of Reason'). Initially, the movement was developed not by artists, but by Enlightenment philosophers. They requested replacing Rococo with a style of rational art, moral and dedicated to the soul. This fitted well with a perception of Classical art as the embodiment of realism, restraint and order. Inspired by ancient Greek and Roman art, the classical history paintings of the French artist Nicolas Poussin (1594–1665) and the ideas of the German writer Anton Raphael Mengs (1728–1779) and the archaeologist and art historian Johann Joachim Winckelmann (1717–1768), Neoclassicism began in Rome, but soon spread throughout Europe. Rome had become the main focus of the Grand Tour by the mid-18th century, and aristocratic travellers went there in search of Classical visions to recreate on their country estates, thus spreading the style across Europe, particularly in England and France. The tour was also an opportunity for collecting Classical antiquities. Neoclassical paintings tended to be populated with figures posed like Classical statues or reliefs, set in a locations filled with archaeological details. The style favoured Greek art over Roman, considering it purer and more authentically classical in its aesthetic goal.

In 1789, France was on the brink of its first revolution and Neoclassicism sought to express their patriotic feelings. Politics and art were closely entwined during this period. They believed that art should be serious, and valued drawings above painting; smooth contours and paint with no discernible brushstrokes were the ultimate aim. Both painting and sculpture exerted calmness and restraint and focused on heroic themes, expressing such noble notions as self-sacrifice and nationalism.

This movement paved the way for Romanticism, that appeared when the idealism of the revolution faded away and after the Napoleonic period came to an end in the early 19th century. Neoclassicism should not be seen as the opposite of Romanticism, however, but in some ways an early manifestation of it.

Western art after 1770 

Many art historians place the origins of modern art in the late 18th century, others in the mid 19th century. Art historian H. Harvard Arnason stated "a gradual metamorphosis took place in the course of a hundred years." Events such as the age of enlightenment, revolutions and democracies in America and France, and the Industrial Revolution had far reaching affects in western culture. People, commodities, ideas, and information could travel between countries and continents with unprecedented speed and these changes were reflected in the arts. The invention of photography in the 1830s further altered certain aspects of art, particularly painting. By the dawn of the 19th century, a long and gradual paradigm shift was complete, from the Gothic when artists were viewed as craftsmen in the service of the church and monarchies, to the idea of art for art's sake, where the ideas and visions of the individual artist were held in the high regard, with patronage from an increasingly literate, affluent, and urban middle and upper class population that had been emerging for 200 years (particularly in Paris and London). A dichotomy began in the late 18th century between neoclassicism and romanticism that subdivided and continued to run through virtually every new movement in modern art: "Spreading like waves, these "isms" defy national, ethnic, and chronological boundaries; never dominant anywhere for long, they compete or merge with each other in endlessly shifting patterns."

Modern art has consistently moved toward international influences and exchanges, from the exotic curiosity of Orientalism, the deeper influence of Japonisme, to the arts of Oceania, Africa, and the Americas. Conversely modern art has increasingly extended beyond western Europe. In Russia and the USA the arts were developing to a degree that rivaled the leading European countries by the end of the 19th century. Many of the major movements appeared in Latin America, Australia, and Asia too and geography and nationality became increasingly insignificant with each passing decade. By the 20th century important and influential artists were emerging around the world: e.g. Foujita (Japan), Arshile Gorky (Armenia), Diego Rivera and Frida Kahlo (Mexico), Wifredo Lam (Cuba), Edvard Munch (Norwegian), Roberto Matta (Chilean), Mark Rothko (Lithuanian-American), Fernando Botero Angulo (Colombia), Constantin Brâncuși and Victor Brauner (Romania).

19th century

Romanticism (c. 1790–1880)

Romanticism emerged in the late 18th century out of the German Sturm und Drang movement and flourished in the first half of the 19th century with significant and international manifestations in music, literature, and architecture, as well as the visual arts. It grew from a disillusionment with the rationalism of 18th century Enlightenment. Despite being often viewed as the opposite of Neoclassicism, there were some stylistic overlapping with both movements, and many Romantic artists were excited by classicism. The movement focused on intense emotions, imagination, and on the impressive power of nature, a bigger and more powerful force than the one of men, with its potential for disaster. "Neoclassicism is a new revival of classical antiquity... while Romanticism refers not to a specific style but to an attitude of mind that may reveal itself in any number of ways."

One of the earliest expressions of romanticism was in the English landscape garden, carefully designed to appear natural and standing in dramatic contrast to the formal gardens of the time. The concept of the "natural" English garden was adopted throughout Europe and America in the following decades. In architecture, the romantics frequently turned to alternative sources other than the Greek and Roman examples admired by the neo-classicist. Romantic architecture often revived Gothic forms and other styles such as exotic eastern models. The Palace of Westminster (Houses of Parliament), London is an example of romantic architecture that is also referred to as Gothic Revival. In painting romanticism is exemplified by the paintings of Francisco Goya in Spain, Eugène Delacroix and Théodore Géricault in France, William Blake, Henry Fuseli, Samuel Palmer, and William Turner in England, Caspar David Friedrich and Philipp Otto Runge in Germany, Francesco Hayez in Italy, Johan Christian Claussen Dahl in Norway, and Thomas Cole in America. Examples of sculptors of the romantic period include Antoine-Louis Barye, Jean-Baptiste Carpeaux, Auguste Préault, and François Rude. As romanticism ran its course, some aspects of the movement evolved into symbolism.

Academism

Academism is the codification of art into rules that can be learned in art academies. It promotes the Classical ideals of beauty and artistic perfection. There was also a very strict hierarchy of subjects. At the top, there were paintings that depicted historic events, including the biblical and Classical ones, followed by the portrait and by the landscape. At the bottom of the hierarchy were still life and genre painting. Nicolas Poussin was the artist whose works and theories played the most significant role in the development of academism. The vales of academism were situated in the centre of the Enlightenment project of discovering the basic principles and ideals of art.

During the 18th century, across all Europe, many academies were founded, that will later dominate the art of the 19th century. In order to study at an art academy, young artist had to take an admission exam, and after being admitted, they would study there for multiple years. Most of the 19th century French art movements were exterior or even opposing the values of academism.

Some of the most important artists of the French academy were William Bouguereau (1825–1905), Jean-Léon Gérôme (1824–1904), Alexandre Cabanel (1823–1889) and Thomas Couture (1815–1879). Academic art is closely related to Beaux-Arts architecture, which developed in the same place and holds to a similar classicizing ideal. The Beaux-Arts style takes its name from the École des Beaux-Arts in Paris, where it developed and where many of the main exponents of the style studied.

Revivalism and Eclecticism 
When it comes to architecture and applied arts, the 19th century is best known as the century of revivals. One of the most well-known revivalist styles is the Gothic Revival or Neo-Gothic, which first appeared in the mid-18th century in a few houses in England, like the Strawberry Hill House in London. However, these houses were isolated cases, since the beginning of the 19th century was dominated by Neoclassicism. Later, between 1830 and 1840, a taste and nostalgia for the rediscovery of past styles, ranging from the Middle Ages to the 18th century, developed under the influence of romanticism. Approximatively until World War I, rehashes of the past dominated the world of architecture and applied arts. Associations between styles and building types appeared, for example: Egyptian for prisons, Gothic for churches, or Renaissance Revival for banks and exchanges. These choices were the result of other associations: the pharaohs with death and eternity, the Middle Ages with Christianity, or the Medici family with the rise of banking and modern commerce. Sometimes, these styles were also seen in a nationalistic way, on the idea that architecture might represent the glory of a nation. Some of them were seen as 'national styles', like the Gothic Revival in the UK and the German states or the Romanian Revival in Romania. Augustus Pugin called the Gothic style the 'absolute duty' of the English architect, despite the fact that the style is of French origin. This way, architecture and the applied arts were used to grant the aura of a highly idealized glorious past. Some architects and designers associated historic styles, especially the medieval ones, with an idealized fantasy organic life, which they put in comparison with the reality of their time.

Despite revivalism being so prevalent, this doesn't mean that there was no originality in these works. Architects, ébénistes and other craftsmen, especially during the second half of the 19th century, created mixes of styles, by extracting and interpreting elements specific to certain eras and areas. This practice is known as eclecticism. This stylistic development occurred during a period when the competition of World's Fairs motivated many countries to invent new industrial methods of creation.

Realism (c. 1830–1890) 

Realism emerged in the mid-nineteenth century, c. 1840, and had counterparts in sculpture, literature, and drama, often referred to as Naturalism in literature. In nineteenth-century painting, the term Realism refers more to the subject matter depicted than to the style or technique. Realist paintings typically represent ordinary places and people engaged in everyday activities, as opposed to grand, idealized landscapes, mythological gods, biblical subjects, and historical figures and events that had often dominated painting in western culture. Courbet said "I cannot paint an angel because I have never seen one".

Realism was also in part a reaction to the often dramatic, exotic, and emotionally charged work of romanticism. The term realism is applied relative to the idealized imagery of neo-classicism and the romanticized imagery of romanticism. Artists such as Jean-Baptiste-Camille Corot and Honoré Daumier had loose associations with realism, as did members of the Barbizon School, particularly Jean-François Millet, but it was perhaps Gustave Courbet who was the central figure in the movement, self identifying as a realist, advocating realism, and influencing younger artists such as Édouard Manet. One significant aspect of realism was the practice of painting landscapes en plein air and its subsequent influence on impressionism.

Beyond France, realism is exemplified by artists such as Wilhelm Leibl in Germany, Ford Madox Brown in England, and Winslow Homer in the United States. Art historian H. H. Arnason wrote, "The chronological sequence of neo-classicism, romanticism, and realism is, of course, only a convenient stratification of movements or tendencies so inextricably bound up with one another and with the preceding movements that it is impossible to tell where one ended and another began", and this becomes even more pertinent and complex as one follows all of the movements and "isms" into the late 19th and early 20th centuries.

Impressionism (c. 1865–1885) 

Impressionism emerged in France, under the influences of Realism, the Barbizon School, and en plein air painters like Eugène Boudin, Camille Corot, Charles- Francois Daubigny, and Johan Barthold Jongkind. Starting in the late 1850s, several of the impressionists had made acquaintances and friendships as students in Paris, notably at the free Académie Suisse and Charles Gleyre's studio. Their progressive work was frequently rejected by the conservative juries of the prestigious Académie des Beaux Arts salons, a forum where many artist turned to establish their reputations, and many of the young artist were included in a highly publicized, but much ridiculed Salon des Refusés in 1863. In 1874 they formed the Société Anonyme Coopérative des Artistes Peintres, Sculpteurs, Graveurs, independent of the academy, and mounted the first of several impressionist exhibitions in Paris, through to 1886 when their eighth and final exhibition was held. Important figures in the movement included Frédéric Bazille, Gustave Caillebotte, Mary Cassatt, Paul Cézanne, Edgar Degas, Armand Guillaumin, Édouard Manet, Claude Monet, Berthe Morisot, Camille Pissarro, Pierre-Auguste Renoir, and Alfred Sisley. Although impressionism was primarily a movement of painters, Degas and Renoir also produced sculptures and others like Auguste Rodin and Medardo Rosso are sometimes linked to impressionism. By 1885 impressionism had achieved some prominence, and yet a younger generation were already pushing the limits beyond impressionism. Artist from Russia, Australia, America and Latin America soon adopted impressionist styles. A few of the original impressionist continued producing significant work into the 1910s and 1920s.

Although not unprecedented, many of the techniques used were in contrast to traditional methods. Paintings were often completed in hours or days with wet paint applied to wet paint (opposed to wet on dry paint, completed in weeks and months). Rather than applying glazes and mixed colors, pure colors were often applied side by side, in thick, opaque, impasto strokes; blending in the eye of the viewer when observed from a distance. Black was used very sparingly, or not at all, and defining lines replaced with nuanced strokes of color forming the subjects, contours, and shapes. Art historian H. W. Janson said "instead of adding to the illusion of real space, it strengthens the unity of the actual painted surface." Impressionist paintings typically depict landscapes, portraits, still lifes, domestic scenes, daily leisure and nightlife, all treated in a realist manner. Compositions were often based on unusual perspectives, appearing spontaneous and candid. The paintings were usually void of didactic, symbolic, or metaphoric meanings, and rarely addressed the biblical, mythological, and historical subjects that were so highly regarded by the academies or the darker and psychological interest explored by the symbolist. The nuances of light, shadow, atmosphere, and reflections of colors from surfaces were examined, sometimes emphasizing changes of these elements in time. The painting itself was the subject of the painting. It was art for art's sake, an idea that had been floating around for a few of decades but it perhaps reached a new high and consistency in impressionism.

Symbolism (c. 1860–1915) 

Symbolism emerged in France and Belgium in the 3rd quarter of the nineteenth century and spread throughout Europe in the 1870s, and later to America to a lesser extent. It evolved from romanticism without a clear or defining demarcation point, although poetry, literature, and specifically the publication of Charles Baudelaire's Les Fleurs du mal (The Flowers of Evil) in 1857 were significant in the development of symbolism. It had international expression in poetry, literature, drama, and music. In architecture, the applied arts, and decorative arts symbolism closely paralleled and overlapped into Art Nouveau. Symbolism is often inextricably linked to other contemporary art movements, surfacing and finding expression within other styles like Post-Impressionism, Les Nabis, the Decadent Movement, the Fin-de Siecle, Art Nouveau, The Munich Secession, The Vienna Secession, Expressionism, and even the Pre-Raphaelites, which had formed before and influenced symbolism as well. Artist as diverse as James McNeill Whistler, Eugène Carrière, Ferdinand Hodler, Fernand Khnopff, Giovanni Segantini, Lucien Lévy-Dhurmer, Jean Delville, and James Ensor all had varying degrees of association with symbolism. Art historian Robert L. Delevoy wrote "Symbolism was less a school than the atmosphere of a period." It quickly began to fade with the onset of Fauvism, Cubism, Futurism and had largely dissipated by the outbreak of the First World War, however it did find some sustained development and relevance in the metaphysical school, which in turn had a profound influence on surrealism.

The subjects, themes, and meanings of symbolist art are frequently veiled and obscure, but at its best still manage to resonate deeply on psychological or emotional levels. The subjects are often presented as metaphors or allegories, aiming to evoke highly subjective, personal, introspective emotions and ideas in the viewer, without clearly defining or addressing the subject directly. The poet Stéphane Mallarmé wrote "depict not the thing but the effect it produces" and "To name an object is to suppress three quarters of the pleasure of the poem which is made to be understood little by little". The English painter George Frederic Watts stated "I paint ideas, not things."

Post-Impressionism (c. 1885–1910) 

Post-Impressionism is a rather imprecise term applied to a diverse generation of artists. In its strictest sense, it pertains to four highly influential artists: Paul Cézanne, Paul Gauguin, Georges Seurat, and Vincent van Gogh. Each passed through an impressionist phase, but ultimately emerged with four very original but different styles. Collectively, their work anticipated, and often directly influenced, much of the avant-garde art that appear before the First World War including fauvism, cubism, expressionism, and early abstraction. Cézanne (particularly influential on cubism) and Van Gogh worked in relative isolation, away from Paris, at critical points in their careers, while Seurat and Gauguin worked in groups, more collaboratively, at key points in their development. Another important artist of the period is Toulouse-Lautrec, an influential painter as well as graphic artist. In a broader sense, post-impressionism includes a generation of predominantly French and Belgian artist who worked in a range of styles and groups. Most had come under the sway of impressionism at some point, but pushed their work beyond it into a number of factions as early as the mid-1880s, sometimes as a logical development of impressionism, other times as a reaction against it. Post-Impressionists typically depicted impressionist subjects, but the work, particularly synthetism, often contained symbolism, spiritualism, and moody atmospheres that rarely appeared in impressionism. Unnatural colors, patterns, flat plains, odd perspectives and viewpoints pushed to extremes, all moved the center of modernism a step closer to abstraction with a standard for experimentation.

Neo-Impressionism (Divisionism or Pointillism, c. 1884–1894) explored light and color based on scientific color theories, creating mosaics of brush strokes in pure colors, sometimes laid out in rhythmic patterns with lines influenced by Art Nouveau. The leading artists were Georges Seurat and Paul Signac, others include Henri-Edmond Cross, Maximilien Luce, Albert Dubois-Pillet, and for a period Pissarro and Van Gogh. It was influential on fauvism, and elements of the style appeared in expressionism, cubism, and early abstraction. Synthetism (Cloisonnism c. 1888–1903) Cloisonnism was conceived by Émile Bernard and immediately taken up and developed by Paul Gauguin and others while at an artists' colony in Pont-Aven (Brittany, France). The style resembled cloisonné enamel or stained glass, with flat, bold colors outlined in black or dark colors. Synthetism, exemplified in the work of Gauguin and Paul Sérusier, is slightly a broader term with less emphasis on dark outlines and cloisonné qualities. Other artist include Cuno Amiet, Louis Anquetin, Charles Filiger, Jacob Meyer de Haan, Charles Laval, and Armand Seguin. Their work greatly influenced fauvism and expressionism. Les Nabis (c. 1890–1905: Hebrew for prophets or illuminati) was a larger movement in France and Belgium that eclectically drew on progressive elements in synthetism, neo-impressionism, symbolism, and Art Nouveau. Perhaps more influential than the art, were the numerous theories, manifestoes, and infectious enthusiasm for the avant-garde, setting the tone for the proliferation of movements and "isms" in the first quarter of the 20th century. La Revue Blanche often published Les Nabis and symbolist content. The work of Édouard Vuillard, and Pierre Bonnard, ca. 1890–1910 is exemplary of Les Nabis, though both evolved in their styles and produced significant work into the 1940s. Other artist include Maurice Denis, Maxime Dethomas, Meyer de Haan, Henri-Gabriel Ibels, Georges Lacombe, Aristide Maillol, Paul Ranson, Ker-Xavier Roussel, Armand Séguin, Paul Sérusier, Félix Vallotton, Jan Verkade, and others.

Early 20th century

The history of 20th-century art is a narrative of endless possibilities and the search for new standards, each being torn down in succession by the next. The art movements of Fauvism, Expressionism, Cubism, abstract art, Dadaism and Surrealism led to further explorations of new creative styles and manners of expression. Increasing global interaction during this time saw an equivalent influence of other cultures into Western art, such as Pablo Picasso being influenced by Iberian sculpture, African sculpture and Primitivism. Japonism, and Japanese woodcuts (which had themselves been influenced by Western Renaissance draftsmanship) had an immense influence on Impressionism and subsequent artistic developments. The influential example set by Paul Gauguin's interest in Oceanic art and the sudden popularity among the cognoscenti in early 20th century Paris of newly discovered African fetish sculptures and other works from non-European cultures were taken up by Picasso, Henri Matisse, and many of their colleagues. Later in the 20th century, Pop Art and Abstract Expressionism came to prominence.

Art Nouveau (c. 1890–1914) 
 

Art Nouveau was an international and widespread art and design movement that emerged in the final decades of the 19th century until the First World War in 1914. It was catapulted into international prominence with the 1900 Exposition Universelle in Paris. Developing almost simultaneously in parts of Europe and the US, it was an attempt to create a unique and modern form of expression that evoked the spirit of the new century. It manifested in painting, illustration, sculpture, jewellery, metalwork, glass, ceramics, textiles, graphic design, furniture, architecture, costume design and fashion. Art Nouveau artists aimed to raise the status of craft and design to the level of fine art.

The movement is highly associated with sinuous organic forms, such as flowers, vines and leaves, but also insects and animals, through the works of artists like Alphonse Mucha, Victor Horta, Hector Guimard, Antoni Gaudí, René Lalique or Émile Gallé. Art Nouveau designs and buildings can often be asymmetrical. Although there are identifying characteristics, the style also displayed many regional and national interpretations.

Despite being a short-lived fashion, it paved the way for the modern architecture and design of the 20th century. It was the first architectural style without historic precedent, the 19th century being notorious for a practice known as Historicism, which is the use of visual styles that consciously echo the style of a previous artistic era. Between 1870 and 1900, a crisis of historicism occurred, during which the historicist culture was critiqued, one of the voices being Friedrich Nietzsche in 1874, who diagnosed 'a malignant historical fervour' as one of the crippling symptoms of a modern culture burdened by archaeological study and faith in the laws of historical progression. Despite this, Art Nouveau was also heavily influenced by styles from the past such as Celtic, Gothic and Rococo art, and also by the Arts and Crafts movement, Aestheticism, Symbolism and especially by Japanese art.

Fauvism (c. 1898–1909) 

Fauvism emerged from post-impressionism, gradually developing into the first major movement of the 20th century. Its genesis was in 1895 when Henri Matisse, the oldest and central figure, entered the studio of Gustave Moreau at the Ecole des Beaux-Arts. There he met Georges Rouault, Charles Camoin, Henri Manguin, and Albert Marquet. Marquet said "As early as 1898 Matisse and I were working in what was later to be called the Fauve manner. The first exhibitions at the Indepéndants in which we were, I believe, the only ones to paint in pure tones, go back to 1901." By 1902–03 the circle of like-minded artist had grown to include Georges Braque, André Derain, Raoul Dufy, Othon Friesz, Jean Metzinger, Jean Puy, Louis Valtat, Kees van Dongen, and Maurice de Vlaminck. During this period a number of influential retrospective exhibitions were held in Paris: Seurat (1900, 1905), Van Gogh (1901, 1905), Toulouse-Lautrec (1902), Gauguin (1906), Cézanne (1907), all relatively unknown to the public at that time. Matisse and Derain collected African carvings, a novel but growing curiosity of the time. Matisse spent the summer of 1904 in Saint-Tropez painting with the neo-impressionist Paul Signac and Henri-Edmond Cross, followed in 1905 by Camoin, Manguin, and Marquet. The artist exhibited regularity at the Salon des Indepéndants and the Salon d'Automne 1903–1908 and in 1905 their work created a sensation and a scandal. Matisse stated "We were exhibiting at the Salon d'Automne, Derain, Manguin, Marquet, Puy, and a few others were hung together in one of the larger galleries. In the center of this room the sculptor Marque exhibited a bust of a child very much in the Italian style. Vauxcelles [art critic for Gil Blas] entered the room and said, Well! well! Donatello in the mist of wild beasts! [Donatello chez les fauves]." The movement had not been perceived as an entity by the public, but once published the name stuck. Unlike the impressionist and their long struggle for acceptance, the avant-garde had an eager audience by 1906–1907 and the fauvist were attracting collectors from America to Russia. However fauvism largely dissolved in 1908, as cubism appeared, most of the artist began exploring other styles and moving in different directions. Only Matisse and Dufy continued to explore fauvism into the 1950s.

The fauvist painted landscapes en plein air, interiors, figures, and still lifes, following examples of realism, impressionism, and post-impressionism. They applied paint with loose brushstrokes, in thick, unnatural, often contrasting, vibrant colors, at times straight from the tube. Gauguin's influence, with his exploration of the expressive values and spatial aspects of patterning with flat, pure colors, as well as his interest in primitivism were significant, as was neo-impressionism. Matisse explained – for a long time color served as a complement of design, the painters of the Renaissance constructed the picture by line, adding local color afterwards – writing: "From Delacroix to Van Gogh and chiefly to Gauguin, by way of the Impressionist, who cleared the ground, and Cézanne, who gave the final impulse and introduced colored volumes, we can follow this rehabilitation of color's function, this restoration of its emotive power" Fauvism was the culmination in a shift, from drawing and line as the fundamental foundations of design in painting to color, and they depicted their subjects on the verge of abstraction.

Expressionism (c. 1905–1930) 

 Expressionism was an international movement in painting, sculpture, the graphic arts, poetry, literature, theater, film, and architecture. Some associate the Second Viennese School and other music of the period with the movement. Most historians place the beginning of expressionism in 1905 with the founding of the Die Brücke. However, several artist were producing influential work that was in the spirit of expressionism c. 1885–1905 including Lovis Corinth, James Ensor, Käthe Kollwitz, Paula Modersohn-Becker, Edvard Munch, Emil Nolde, and Christian Rohlfs among others. Many of these artist later exhibited and associated with various expressionist groups. Expressionist painting is characterized by loose, spontaneous, frequently thick, impasto brushwork. It often conveyed how the artist felt about their subject, opposed to what it looked like, putting intuition and gut feelings over realistic representations or art theories. Expressionism was frequently infused with an angst or joy, and an overall engagement with contemporary life and social issues that was often absent from fauvism's focus on design and color applied to neutral subjects. Woodcut prints are particularly noteworthy in expressionism. Expressionism can sometimes overlap and integrate with other styles and movements, such as symbolism, fauvism, cubism, futurism, abstraction, and dada. Several groups and factions of expressionist appeared at various times and places.

Die Brücke (The Bridge: 1905 -1913) aspired to connect "all revolutionary and surging elements." It was founded by four architectural students Ernst Ludwig Kirchner, Erich Heckel, Karl Schmidt-Rottluff, and Fritz Bleyl. Sharing a studio in Dresden they produced paintings, carvings, prints, and organized exhibitions, separating in the summer to work independently. Their first exhibit was in 1905, later joined by Emil Nolde and Max Pechstein in 1906, and Otto Mueller in 1910 among others. Influences included Gothic art, primitivism, Art Nouveau, and developments in Paris, particularly Van Gogh and fauvism. The group shifted to Berlin in 1911 and later dissolved in 1913. Der Blaue Reiter (The Blue Rider: 1911–1914), founded by Wassily Kandinsky and Franz Marc, was a relatively informal group that organized exhibitions of art from Paris and Europe, as well their own. It was one in a series of increasingly progressive groups splitting from the Art Academy in Munich including The Munich Secession in 1892 (realist and impressionist), Phalanx in 1901 (postimpressionist), Neue Kunstler Vereiningung in 1909, and The Blue Rider in 1911. Artist associated with the latter two groups included the Burliuk brothers, Heinrich Campendonk, Alexej von Jawlensky, Paul Klee, August Macke, Gabriele Münter, and Marianne von Werefkin. The euphonious almanac Der Blaue Reiter, a collection of influential essays, and Kandinsky's Concerning the Spiritual in Art with his ideas on non-objective art were both published in 1912. The Blue Rider ended with the outbreak of World War I in which Macke and Marc both died.

Other artists such as Oskar Kokoschka, Egon Schiele, and Richard Gerstl emerged in Austria. French artist Georges Rouault and Chaïm Soutine had affinities with the movement. Sculptors include Ernst Barlach, Wilhelm Lehmbruck, Gerhard Marcks, and William Wauer. Architects associated with expressionism include Max Berg, Hermann Finsterlin, Johann Friedrich Höger, Michel de Klerk, Erich Mendelsohn, Hans Poelzig, Hans Scharoun, Rudolf Steiner, and Bruno Taut. Der Sturm (The Storm 1910–1932) was a magazine with much expressionist content founded by Herwarth Walden, with an associated gallery in Berlin opened in 1912 and a theater company and school in opened 1918. Films regarded as expressionistic, some considered as classics, include The Cabinet of Dr. Caligari (Robert Wiene, 1920), Nosferatu (F. W. Murnau,1922), and Metropolis (Fritz Lang, 1927).

After World War I a tendency to withdraw from the avant-garde by many artist occurred, seen in the work of the original fauvists during the 1920s, Picasso and Stravinsky's neoclassical periods, and De Chirico's late work. This tendency was called New Objectivity (ca. 1919–1933) in Germany, and in contrast to the nostalgic nature of this work elsewhere, it was characterized by disillusionment and ruthless social criticisms. New objectivity artists mostly emerged from expressionist and dada milieus including Otto Dix, Christian Schad, Rudolf Schlichter, Georg Scholz, and Jeanne Mammen. Max Beckmann and George Grosz also had some association with new objectivity for a period. Although not intrinsically expressionistic, the Staatliches Bauhaus (School of Building: 1919–1933) was an influential German school merging crafts, decorative, and fine arts. Moving from Weimar, to Dessau, to Berlin, it changed and evolved in focus with time. Directors included architects Walter Gropius (1919–1928), Hannes Meyer (1928–1930), and Ludwig Mies van der Rohe (1930–1933). At various points the faculty included Josef Albers, Theo van Doesburg, Lyonel Feininger, Johannes Itten, Paul Klee, Wassily Kandinsky, El Lissitzky, Gerhard Marcks, László Moholy-Nagy, Oskar Schlemmer. Bauhaus architects greatly influenced the International Style, which was characterized by simplified forms, a lack of ornamentation, a union of design and function, and the idea that mass production could be compatible with personal artistic vision. As the Nazi Party rose to power, modern art was dubbed "degenerate art" and the Bauhaus was closed in 1933, subduing modernism in Germany for several years.

Cubism (c. 1907–1914)

Cubism consisted in the rejection of perspective, which leads to a new organisation of space where viewpoints multiply producing a fragmentation of the object that renders the predilection for form over the content of the representation obvious. Pablo Picasso, Georges Braque and other Cubist artists were inspired by the sculptures of Iberia, Africa and Oceania exhibited in the Louvre and the ethnographic museum in the Trocadéro, and which were being offered at flee markets and in sale rooms.

'A Picasso studies an object the way a surgeon dissects a corpse,' wrote the critic and poet Guillaume Apollinaire in 1913. Five years earlier, Pablo Picasso and Georges Braque – friends, colleagues and rivals – had begun to reject perspectival realism for a form of artistic autopsy: an utterly revolutionary painting style that looked inside and around objects, presenting them analytically, objectively and completely impersonally.

Art Deco (c. 1920–1940)

Art Deco appeared in France as a style of luxury and modernity. Soon, it spread quickly throughout the world, most dramatically in America, becoming more streamlined though the 1930s. The style was named after the International Exhibition of Modern Decorative and Industrial Arts held in Paris in 1925. Its exuberance and fantasy captured the spirit of the 'roaring 20s' and provided an escape from the realities of the Great Depression during the 1930s. It had ancient Greek, Roman, African, Aztec and Japanese influences, but also Futurist, Cubist and Bauhaus ones. It sometimes blended with the Egyptian Revival style, due to the discovery in 1922 of the Tomb of Tutankhamun and the Egyptomania that it caused. Two examples of this are Le Louxor Cinema in Paris, 1919–1921, by Henri Zipcy, and the Egyptian Theatre in DeKalb (Illinois, USA), 1929–1930, by Elmer F. Behrns. In decorative arts, including architecture, low-relief designs, and angular patterns and shapes were used. Predominant materials include chrome, brass, polished steel and aluminum, inlaid wood, stone and stained glass.

Some of the most important Art Deco artists are the Paris-based Polish painter Tamara de Lempicka, the Ukrainian-born French poster artist Adolphe Jean-Marie Mouron, known as Cassandre, and the French furniture designer and interior decorator Émile-Jacques Ruhlmann.

Surrealism (c. 1924–1966) 
Surrealism emerged as a faction of Dada, formally announcing its inception in 1924 with André Breton's Manifesto of Surrealism. Originally a literary group of poets and writers in Paris, it soon developed into an international movement that included painters, sculptors, photographers, and filmmakers. A Second Manifeste du Surréalisme was published in 1929. Surrealism did not have significant expression in applied or decorative arts, architecture, or music, although a few isolated examples could be identified (e.g. chess sets, furniture, and Las Pozas). The small and short lived Metaphysical School (c. 1910–1921), with Giorgio de Chirico as its principal figure, was highly influential on surrealism. The surrealist explored a myriad of innovative techniques, some had recently been developed in Cubism and Dada, others were new, including collage, found objects, assemblage, random chance, rayographs (photograms), painting on sand, dripping and flinging paint, decalcomania, frottage, fumage, and raclage. Two fundamental approaches predominate surrealist art. Automatism dominated in the early years which can be seen in the work of artist like André Masson and Joan Miró. Other artist, swayed by work of Giorgio de Chirico, used more traditional methods and mediums to illustrate unfiltered thoughts and incongruous juxtapositions, including Salvador Dalí and René Magritte. Significant artist include Jean Arp, Hans Bellmer, Victor Brauner, Luis Buñuel, Joseph Cornell, Óscar Domínguez, Max Ernst, Wifredo Lam, Yves Tanguy, Man Ray, Alberto Giacometti, Méret Oppenheim, and Roberto Matta. Other important artist informally accosted with surrealism include Marcel Duchamp, Pablo Picasso, and Frida Kahlo. Surrealist ideas and theories were discussed in a successive series of journals, La Révolution Surréaliste (1924–1929), Le Surrealisme au service de la revolution (1930–1933), Minotaure (1933–1939), VVV (1942–1944). The automatic paintings produced by André Masson and Joan Miró, as well as latecomers to surrealism like Roberto Matta and Arshile Gorky had a considerable influenced on the abstract expressionist in the late 1940s.

With a measure of Dada's irreverence and contempt for the traditional political, religious, and bourgeois values of western culture that they believed had led the world into the First World War (Breton and other founding members were veterans); the surrealist explored the possibilities that had been opened up by Sigmund Freud regarding the subconscious mind: "Pure psychic automatism, by which one intends to express verbally, in writing or by any other method, the real functioning of the mind. Dictation by thought, in the absence of any control exercised by reason, and beyond any aesthetic or moral preoccupation." Surrealism sought to express pure thought, unfiltered and uncensored by political, religious, moral, or rational principles.

Mid and late 20th century

As Europe struggled to recover from World War II, America moved into a position of political, economic and cultural strength. During the 1940s and 1950s, Abstract Expressionism emerged as the first specifically American art movement to have an international impact. In consequence, the art world's focus shifted from Europe to New York. Abstract Expressionists were a small group of loosely associated artists who had similar outlooks but different approaches. They were influenced by Surrealism, and believed in spontaneity, freedom of expression and abandonment of the themes of American life that had characterized national art of recent decades. One of the most famous representative of this movement was Jackson Pollock, known for his painting made by pouring, flicking and dripping paint on to huge canvases on the ground. Other artists include Willem de Kooning, Franz Kline, Robert Motherwell, Barnett Newman, Mark Rothko and Clyfford Still.

After World War II, consumerism and the mass media surged, and as a result, Pop art developed in both London and New York. In a London exhibition in 1956, the word 'Pop' was used in a collage created by Richard Hamilton (1922–2011) made of American magazines. Pop art was a reaction against Abstract Expressionism, and interpreted ideas of pop culture. In celebrating and commenting on consumerism, pop artists, as they became known, produced colorful images based on advertising, the media and shopping, featuring film stars, comic strips, flags, packaging and food – things that everyone, rather than just a highbrow few, could relate to.

The term Minimalism was not new, but it gained momentum in the 1960s, specifically describing a style of art characterized by detached restraint. Originating in New York, it was a reaction against Abstract Expressionism, but it also embraced Constructivist ideas that art should be made of modern materials. Thus, Minimalist artists, primarily sculptors, often used non-traditional materials and production methods, often employing industrial or specialist fabricators to produce works to their specifications. The term was chiefly used to describe a group of American sculptors who re-evaluated the space around them, aiming to challenge assumptions and present familiar objects in new ways. Their artworks don't have any symbolism or hidden meaning, as they try to enable viewers to re-evaluate art and space around forms. Unlike a figural sculpture on which the viewer focuses to the exclusion of the room in which it stands, Minimalist art becomes one with its space. By focusing on the effects of context and the theatricality of the viewing experience, Minimalism exerted an indirect but powerful influence on later developments in Conceptual and Performance art, as well as providing a foil for the rise of Postmodernism.

Despite developing almost 50 years after Marcel Duchamp's ideas, Conceptual art showed that art does not always have to be judged aesthetically. It was never a single, cohesive movement, but an umbrella term that now covers several types of art and emerged more or less concurrently in America and Europe, first defined in New York. Conceptual artists promote the art of ideas, or concepts, suggesting that they can be more valid in the modern world than technical skill or aesthetics. No matter the art media of an artwork, it is considered as no more than a vehicle for presenting the concept. At its most extreme, Conceptual art foregoes the physical object completely, using verbal or written message to convey the idea.

See also

 Art of Europe
 Art market
 Art movement
 Art periods
 Ancient art
 History of animation
 History of Asian art
 History of film
 History of literature
 History of music
 History of nude art
 History of painting
 History of photography
 History of poetry
 History of theatre
 List of art movements
 List of French artistic movements
 List of music styles
 Timeline for invention in the arts
 Timeline of art
 Western art history
 Women artists

Notes

References

 
 
 
 
 

 
 
 
 
 
 
 
 
 
 
 
 
 
 
 

 
 
 
 
 
 
 
 
 
 
 
 
 

 
 
 
 
 
 
 
 
 

 
 
 

 
 
 
 
 

 
 
 
 

 
 
 
 
 
 
 
 

 

 
 
 

 
 
 

 
 

 
 
 
 
 
 
 
 

 
 
 
 
  
 
 
 
 
 

 

 
 
 
 
 
 
 

 
 
 
 
 
 

 
 
 
 
 

 
 
 
 

 

 
 
 
 
 
 Antonio Luis Ramos Molina, La magia de la química fotográfica: El quimigrama. Conceptos, técnicas y procedimientos del quimigrama en la expresión artística, In: Tesis Doctoral, Universidad de Granada 2018.

Further reading

External links

 "Art: The history of ideas in literature and the arts in aesthetic theory and literary criticism" – The Dictionary of the History of Ideas
 Art History resources
 Ars Summum Project

Timelines
 Timeline of Art History from Metropolitan Museum of Art